Lionel Leong or Leong Vai Tac (born June 1962), local Chinese, is a political figure of the Macao Special Administrative Region of the People's Republic of China.

Leong was inaugurated as the 4th Secretary of Economy and Finance of Macao Special Administrative Region (MSAR) since 20 December 2014. He was also one of the MSAR delegates to the 11th and 12th National People's Congress; member of the 9th Chinese People's Political Consultative Conference Hebei Provincial Committee; member of the Council for the Election of Deputies of MSAR to the 9th – 13th National People's Congress; member of China, Asia Pacific Group of the Trilateral Commission; member of the Selection Committee for the first MSAR Government; member of the Election Committee of MSAR Chief Executive in 2004, 2009 and 2014; member of the 2nd and 3rd Executive Council of the MSAR; member of the University Assembly of University of Macau; member of the Board of Trustees of Macao Foundation; Vice Chairman of the Macao Advisory Council on the Environment; member of the Evaluation Committee of Macao Science and Technology Awards; President of the Digital & Information Technology Committee of Macau Productivity and Technology Transfer Center; member of the Board of Trustees of the Macao Cultural Industries Fund; President of Macau Development Strategy Research Centre; Chairman of the Advisory Board of Macau Economic Association; Director General of Charity Fund From the Readers of Macao Daily News; President of Pan Mac Junior Chamber and Vice President of the Kiang Wu Hospital Charitable Association, etc.

Leong's nickname is "財爺 (God of Wealth), "due to his position as the Secretary of Economy and Finance. After the catastrophic typhoon "Hato" on 23 August 2017, the public caught sights of him cleaning up collapsed trees on the street and therefore the media also nicknamed him as "搬樹大叔(Move Trees Uncle)".

Education 
Leong went to Instituto Salesiano de Macau for his high school and continued with his studies in Canada in 1977. In 1983, he graduated with a Bachelor degree in Mathematics from University of Waterloo ,Canada.

Family 
Born in June 1962 in Macau, of a family from Yunfu City, Guangdong Province, Leong is married with two sons and one daughter. His father is a veterinarian while his mother is a housewife; and he has a younger sister. His grandfather, Doctor Chan Mun (陳滿) (1907-1990), was one of the leaders for the Macao New Democracy Movement in the 1940s and 50s and involved in the founding of "Xin Yuan Di" (新園地) (former body of Macao Daily News) acting as the Publisher. Doctor Chan had also held posts of the Chairman of the Board of Directors of Hou Kong Middle School, President of the Chinese Medical Association, and contributed to the works of Macau Tung Sin Tong Charitable Society and Macao Workers' Medical Clinic.

Civil service

Secretary of Economy and Finance 
On 30 November 2014, Leong was appointed by the State Council of the People's Republic of China as the 4th Secretary of Economy and Finance for MSAR. He believes that his most important responsibilities are to facilitate stable economic development, maintain MSAR's stability in finance and forex, support the development of SMEs, ensure local employment and promote moderate economic diversification development of the MSAR.

He had expressed that there will be promising prospects if MSAR continues to fully use well the policies from the Central Government, such as CEPA, Economic Cooperation between Guangdong and Macao, "One Centre One Platform" etc., and integrates the economic development of Macao into China's.

MSAR Executive Council 
On 15 December 2004, he was appointed as the member of the 2nd Executive Council of MSAR.

On 1 December 2009, he was re-appointed as the member of the 3rd Executive Council of MSAR together with 7 other individuals including Leong Heng Teng and Liao Zeyun.

(Member List of the Executive Council of MSAR)

(The 2nd Executive Council)

Florinda da Rosa Silva Chan, Tong Chi Kin, Leong Heng Teng, Liao Zeyun, Ma Iao Lai, Ho Iat Seng, Leonel Alves, Cheang Chi Keong, Lam Heong Sang and Leong Vai Tac.

(The 3rd Executive Council)

Florinda da Rosa Silva Chan, Leong Heng Teng, Liao Zeyun, Ma Iao Lai, Leonel Alves, Cheang Chi Keong, Leong Vai Tac, Chan Meng Kam, Ho Sut Heng, Wong Yue Kai, Lam Kam Seng (appointed at 2013 year-end).

MSAR committees 
In 2009, he was appointed as the member of Macao Advisory Council on the Environment by the MSAR Government and was then elected by the members as the Vice Chairman. He was also the former President of the MSAR Environment Committee.

Leong also held the positions of the President of the Advisory Board of Macau Productivity and Technology Transfer Center, member of Board of Trustees of Macao Cultural Industries Fund, member of the Evaluation Committee of Macao Science and Technology Awards, Convener of Designated Project Team of MSAR Cultural Industry Committee.

National People's Congress

Delegate to the 11th National People's Congress 
On 27 January 2008, 319 members attended the Council for the Election of Deputies to the 11th National People's Congress. The members anonymously voted and elected 12 MSAR delegates among 17 nominees. The first-time nominated Leong Vai Tac was elected with a 95.9% of votes amongst 317 valid votes, Lao Ngai Leong was also elected with the same number of votes.

(List of MSAR delegates to 11th National People's Congress of the People's Republic of China)

Lei Pui Lam, Chio Ngan Ieng, Paula Ling Hsião Yun, Io Hong Meng, Kou Hoi In, Lok Po, Chui Sai Peng José, Leong Iok Wa, Leong Vai Tac, Ho Iat Seng, Lao Cheok Va and Lao Ngai Leong.

Standing Committee of the National People's Congress: Ho Iat Seng

Delegate to the 12th National People's Congress 
On 17 December 2012, 359 members attended the second meeting of the Council for the Election of Deputies to the 12th National People's Congress and elected 12 MSAR delegates among 15 nominees. Leong Vai Tac was re-elected with a 95.14% votes amongst 350 valid votes.

(List of MSAR delegates to the 12th National People's Congress of the People's Republic of China)

Lei Pui Lam, Ho Sut Heng, Paula Hsião Yun Ling, Io Hong Meng, Kou Hoi In, Iong Weng Ian, Lok Po, Chui Sai Peng José, Leong Iok Wa, Lionel Leong Vai Tac, Ho Iat Seng, Lao Ngai Leong.

Standing Committee of the National People's Congress: Ho Iat Seng

Chinese People's Political Consultative Conference 
Leong Vai Tac was a member of the 9th Chinese People's Political Consultative Conference Hebei Provincial Committee.

International duties 
Leong Vai Tac was a member of the China, Asia Pacific Group of the Trilateral Commission, and was the only person from Macau in the China group at the time. The Trilateral Commission is a non-governmental, policy-oriented forum that brings together leaders in their individual capacity from the worlds of business, government, academic, press and media, as well as civic society. The Commission offers a global platform for open dialogue, reaching out to those with different views and engaging with decision makers from around the world with the aim of finding solutions to the great geopolitical, economic and social challenges of the time.

Community duties

President of Macau Development Strategy Research Centre 

Founding President of Macau Development Strategy Research Centre (Term: 1997-2014)

Leong founded Macau Development Strategy Research Centre together with several individuals from the industrial, commercial and academic sectors in November 1997, asserting to research on promoting Macao's long-term sustainable development through a scientific and responsible attitude. Previous research topics cover political talents, regional cooperation, middle class society, public administration reform, quality of residents, social economy, etc. Since 2002 until now, the research centre has been organising "Brainstorming for Macau" 「齊為澳門動腦筋」event every year, random events and discussion talks such as "Politics and Social Salon" 「時政沙龍」, as well as inviting guests from different sectors to share views on Macao's policy development.

(The 13th) President of the Charity Fund From the Readers of Macao Daily News 

Charity Fund From the Readers of Macao Daily News was established in 1984 with the aim of "One for all, all for one". Every year on the second Sunday in December, the Fund organises "Walk for a Million" and raise funds for emergency issues, care for the needy, education and medical assistance to the poor, etc.

Pan Mac Junior Chamber 

President of the Pan Mac Junior Chamber (1992)

Pan Mac Junior Chamber was established in 1984 and is one of the subsidiaries of Junior Chamber International Macao, China, aiming to encourage young people to create positive change by providing development opportunities.

Career background 
After graduating from university in 1983, Leong returned to Macao but faced dramatic change in the financial situation of the family. He had worked as a computer programmer, part-time evening school teacher, and was an apparel factory production department worker and sewing machine repair worker before promoted to manager within a year. When he left the apparel factory in 1987, he was manager of Sales department and Human Resources department.

In 1987, he bought by a 21-month instalment an apparel factory with only 30 workers. Since he had no excessive fund to purchase any quota under the "Quota System", he self developed the Japanese market which did not have quota limitation but well known for demanding very high standard product quality. In 1997, the factory expanded into Seng San Enterprises Limited and in 1999, moved to Concordia Industrial Park in Coloane. The company then focus on manufacturing world brands, producing over 3 million clothing every year and was known as one of the biggest garment manufacturers in Macao. It was also the first garment manufacturer in China accredited with ISO9000, ISO14000 and OHSAS18000 at the same time.

In 2001, Leong established Smartable Holding Limited and invested over MOP200 million to build a professional laundry of over 73,000 sq. ft. in Coloane in 2007, transforming from garment manufacturing to service chain downstream industry. The factory is in operation since 2009 and offers laundry services to international brand hotels in Macao. With its environment friendly water conservation system, it can save 2/3 water and energy, as compared to ordinary industrial free-standing washing machine, when washing the same amount of linen. Currently, it can provide laundry service for linen of 25,000 hotel rooms and 48,000 sets of uniform every day, being the world's highest productivity (per square feet) professional laundry and also being the first professional laundry company accredited ISO 9001:2008 in Macao.

He had been a member of the Standing Committee of Directors of the Macao Chamber of Commerce; Vice President of Industrial Association of Macau; Vice President of the Macau Importers and Exporters Association.

Merit 
Leong is the recipient of the first Medal of Merit – Industry and Commerce awarded by the Macao SAR Government in 2001.

References

 Lionel Leong

1962 births
Living people
Macau people
Government ministers of Macau
University of Waterloo alumni
Delegates to the 12th National People's Congress
Delegates to the 11th National People's Congress